Yāsir ibn ʿĀmir ibn Mālik al-ʿAnsīy (sixth/seventh century C.E.) was an early companion of the Islamic prophet Muhammad. He is the second martyr in Islam, with the first being his wife, Sumayyah.

Early life
Yasir was originally from the Malik clan of the Madhhij tribe in Yemen. He and his two brothers, Al-Harith and Malik, travelled northwards to Mecca to search for a fourth brother who was lost. Al-Harith and Malik returned to Yemen, but Yasir decided to settle in Mecca. He entered the protection of Abu Hudhayfa ibn al-Mughira, a member of the Makhzum clan of the Quraysh tribe.

Abu Hudhayfa gave Yasir his slave Sumayyah as a wife, and she bore him a son, Ammar, in c.566. Yasir also had two other sons, Hurth and Abdullah, but there is no indication that Sumayyah was their mother. Hurth, who was the eldest of the three, was killed by the Dil clan before 610.

Conversion to Islam
Yasir, Sumayyah, Abdullah and Ammar all became Muslims at an early date "on the rise of Islam". From c.614 the Quraysh persecuted Muslims of low social rank. After the death of Abu Hudhayfa left Yasir and his family without a protector in Mecca, the Makhzum clan tortured them to pressure them to abandon their faith.

Yasir, Sumayyah and Ammar were forced to stand in the sun in the heat of the day dressed in mail-coats. Muhammad passed while they were standing like that and urged them, "Patience, O family of Yasir! Your meeting-place will be Paradise."

Abu Jahl, a member of the Makhzum clan, killed Sumayyah by stabbing and impaling her with his spear.

Death and legacy
It is generally assumed that Yasir was also killed in the persecution.

However, there is no mention of Yasir's death in any of the early sources such as Ibn Ishaq, Ibn Sa'd, Bukhari, Muslim or Tabari. Since he is not named among those who emigrated to Medina in 622, he probably died before that date; but it is possible that his death was natural.

See also
Al-Ansi
Sahaba

References

External links
http://www.haneen.com.eg/islam/SahabahStories/Ammar.shtm

Sahabah martyrs